Statistics of Mestaruussarja in the 1988 season.

Overview 
It was contested by 12 teams, and HJK Helsinki won the championship.

Preliminary stage

Table

Results

Championship group

Table

Results

Relegation group

Table

Results

See also
Ykkönen (Tier 2)

References 
 Finland - List of final tables (RSSSF)

Mestaruussarja seasons
Fin
Fin
1